Raja mauritaniensis, commonly known as the African ray, is a species of ray in the family Rajidae.

This species was described in 1977, but the currently used scientific name is a homonym, preoccupied by Raja africana , which is a synonym of Urogymnus asperrimus. Consequently, a replacement scientific name is needed for the African ray. Furthermore, the validity of the African ray has been questioned, with some suggesting that its type specimen may be an aberrant R. miraletus or R. straeleni.

References

African skate
Fish of West Africa
Fish of Africa
Marine fauna of North Africa
Fish described in 2021